A quagmire is a wetland type, dominated by living, peat-forming plants.

Quagmire may also refer to:

People
 Joshua Quagmire or JQ (born 1952), American cartoonist, best known for Cutey Bunny

Arts, entertainment and media

Fictional entities
 Quagmire (comics), a Marvel Comics character
 Quagmire family, characters from the animated television sitcom Family Guy
 Glenn Quagmire, a friend of the head of the family
 Quagmire family, a principal family in the children's novel series A Series of Unfortunate Events
 Quagmire Moat, half of the Moat Twins from Eureeka's Castle
 Quagmire McDuck, a Disney character from Clan McDuck

Games
 Quagmire, a level in the game Banjo-Tooie
 Quagmire, a black enchantment from the card game Magic: The Gathering
 Quagmire, a skill in the game Ragnarok Online used by Wizards
 Quagmire, a fictitious place in the game World of Warcraft
 Quagmire! (X6), a 1984 expert-level Dungeons & Dragons module

Other arts, entertainment and media
 "Quagmire" (The X-Files), an episode of The X-Files
 Quagmire, the setting for Ben Dunn's Ninja High School comics, and the title of two mini-series spun off from them

Other uses
 The Quagmire, a figurative name for the Vietnam War